Liga Bolasepak Rakyat is the fourth-tier football league in Malaysia. The league is managed by Liga Bolasepak Rakyat-Limited Liability Partnership (LBR-LLP) and it is an amateur-level competition. It was established in 2015 to provide an alternative entry point for young players. For 2016–17 season, there are a total of 108 clubs participated in the league to represent their district out of more than 150 possible districts in the country to play in the league. The clubs were divided into 8 zones according to their regional location.

The current champion is Kuching, a club from Borneo Zone 2 which won the league in 2015-16 season.

LBR West Zone
There are 14 clubs competing in West Zone this season.

  Barat Daya
  Seberang Prai Selatan
  Timur Laut Baru
  Batang Padang
  Kuala Kangsar
  Hilir Perak
  Manjung
  Kampar
  Ipoh (Kinta)
  Batu Gajah (Kinta)
  Kerian
  Lenggong (Hulu Perak)
  Grik (Hulu Perak)
  Tanjung Malim (Muallim)

The team that did not compete for the season 2016/2017

  Sungai Siput (Kuala Kangsar)
  Perak Tengah

Competition format
For the western zone, all 14 teams are divided into 3 groups. Preliminary round or a group matches will take place on a home away basis. All group winners will compete in the playoffs where no return leg will take place. 2 best teams in the playoffs will advance to the national level

Group A
  Tanjung Malim (Muallim)
  Kerian
  Lenggong (Hulu Perak)
  Batang Padang
  Timur Laut Baru

Group B
  Manjung
  Seberang Prai Selatan
  Kampar
  Batu Gajah (Kinta)
  Kuala Kangsar

Group C
  Ipoh (Kinta)
  Barat Daya
  Hilir Perak
  Grik (Hulu Perak)

References

Football competitions in Malaysia